Artur dos Santos Lima (born 13 May 1956), known as Arturzinho, is a Brazilian professional football coach and former player who was most recently in charge of Centro Esportivo Social Arturzinho in 2019. 

Before his career as a coach, Arturzinho played as a midfielder, most notably for Vitória and Bahia.

Career
Began his professional career in the São Cristóvão in 1974. In 1976, he moved back to Fluminense in 1978 on the mastery of Campeonato Carioca in 1976, 1979 and 1982. he appeared in Operário. In 1982, he was again in Atlético Mineiro. In the years 1982-1990 he was successively in Bangu, Vasco da Gama, Corinthians for the second time in Bangu. In 1990, he appeared in Fortaleza and Paysandu, and then after the last player years he spent Bahia and Vitória.

At the end of Arthurzinho was a coach. He began his career in Vitória, won mastery for a player in 1997. same year was in Fluminense. Drove with mere highlight the Joinville, including leading to support team of Santa Catarina, the access to the Série B. had a quick passage by Paysandu, in 2013. and in the beginning of 2015, he hit his trip to America but after much contestamento on the part of the board of directors and fans of the club, was crashing before the straight end of the Campeonato Carioca Série B, in which the club won.

Honours

Player
Fluminense
 Campeonato Carioca: 1976

Operário
 Campeonato Sul-Mato-Grossense: 1978, 1979, 1980 e 1981

Vitória
 Campeonato Baiano: 1992

 Bahia
 Campeonato Baiano: 1994

Coach
Vitória
 Campeonato Baiano: 1997, 2000
 Copa do Nordeste: 1997

Vila Nova
 Campeonato Goiano: 2001

América-RN
 Copa do Nordeste: 1998

Joinville
 Campeonato Brasileiro Série C: 2011
 Copa Santa Catarina: 2011

References

 

1956 births
Living people
Footballers from Rio de Janeiro (city)
Brazilian footballers
Brazilian football managers
Association football midfielders
Campeonato Brasileiro Série A players
Campeonato Brasileiro Série A managers
Campeonato Brasileiro Série B managers
São Cristóvão de Futebol e Regatas players
Fluminense FC players
Operário Futebol Clube (MS) players
Sport Club Internacional players
Bangu Atlético Clube players
CR Vasco da Gama players
Sport Club Corinthians Paulista players
Botafogo de Futebol e Regatas players
Fortaleza Esporte Clube players
Paysandu Sport Club players
Villa Nova Atlético Clube players
Madureira Esporte Clube players
Olaria Atlético Clube players
Esporte Clube Vitória managers
Fluminense FC managers
América Futebol Clube (RN) managers
Sampaio Corrêa Futebol Clube managers
Santa Cruz Futebol Clube managers
Vila Nova Futebol Clube managers
Associação Desportiva Cabofriense managers
Olaria Atlético Clube managers
Esporte Clube Bahia managers
ABC Futebol Clube managers
Associação Atlética Anapolina managers
Joinville Esporte Clube managers
Clube Recreativo e Atlético Catalano managers
Paysandu Sport Club managers
America Football Club (RJ) managers
Bangu Atlético Clube managers